Kwarteng is a Ghanaian surname. Notable people with the surname include:

 Kwasi Kwarteng (born 1975), British politician and historian
 Kwaku Kwarteng (born 1969), Ghanaian civil engineer, economist, and politician
Nana Koduah Kwarteng, Ghanaian politician

See also

 

Ghanaian surnames